Walé Oyéjidé is a Nigerian-American lawyer, musician and fashion designer. He is the founder and Creative Director of the fashion company Ikire Jones.

Early life
Oyéjide was born in 1981, in Ibadan, Nigeria. In the 1990s, he moved to Dubai, United Arab Emirates, with his mother before moving to Alabama, U.S., in his teenage years.

Education
Oyejide studied law and went to law school.

Careers

Musical career
Oyejide has released four musical albums, including one day everything changed (2004), Broken Jazz 101 (2004), and Africahot! The Afrofuture Sessions (2006).

Law career
Oyejide left music for law school. He practiced law for some years before delving into fashion.

Fashion career
Oyejide started his fashion company, Ikire Jones, in 2014 after quitting his job as a lawyer. Ikire Jones, as described by Oyejide during his interview with Okayafrica, is a combination of Neapolitan tailoring and African aesthetics. Ikire Jones designed some outfits for the Marvel movie Black Panther.

Media
Oyejide has appeared on the public television series Articulate in 2015.

Personal life
Oyejide is married and has a daughter.

References

1981 births
Living people
American people of Nigerian descent
American lawyers